Iranattus principalis is a species of spider in the family Salticidae. It is found in Nigeria and Zimbabwe. Originally described as Monomotapa principalis, it was transferred to Iranattus in 2017. Iranattus and Monomotapa were previously monotypic genera.

References

Salticidae
Spiders of Africa
Spiders of Asia
Spiders described in 2000